Liodessus is a genus of beetles in the family Dytiscidae, containing the following species:

 Liodessus abjectus (Sharp, 1882)
 Liodessus acollensis Guignot, 1955
 Liodessus affinis (Say, 1823)
 Liodessus andinus Guignot, 1957
 Liodessus antrias Guignot, 1955
 Liodessus bogotensis Guignot, 1953
 Liodessus bonariensis (Steinheil, 1869)
 Liodessus bordoni Pederzani, 2001
 Liodessus cancellosus Guignot, 1957
 Liodessus cantralli (Young, 1953)
 Liodessus chilensis (Solier, 1849)
 Liodessus crassus (Sharp, 1882)
 Liodessus crotchi Nilsson, 2001
 Liodessus deflectus Ordish, 1966
 Liodessus delfini (Régimbart, 1899)
 Liodessus dilatatus (Régimbart, 1895)
 Liodessus emaciatus Guignot, 1953
 Liodessus fijiensis (J.Balfour-Browne, 1944)
 Liodessus flavicollis (LeConte, 1855)
 Liodessus flavofasciatus (Steinheil, 1869)
 Liodessus guttatus Biström, 1988
 Liodessus hobbsi (Young, 1950)
 Liodessus incrassatus Biström, 1988
 Liodessus involucer (Brinck, 1948)
 Liodessus legrosi Biström, 1988
 Liodessus leonensis Franciscolo & Sanfilippo, 1990
 Liodessus luteopictus (Régimbart, 1897)
 Liodessus microscopicus (Zimmermann, 1921)
 Liodessus miersii (White, 1847)
 Liodessus noviaffinis K.B.Miller, 1998
 Liodessus obscurellus (LeConte, 1852)
 Liodessus ophonoides Guignot, 1955
 Liodessus patagonicus (Zimmermann, 1923)
 Liodessus plicatus (Sharp, 1882)
 Liodessus rhicnodes Guignot, 1955
 Liodessus riveti (Peschet, 1923)
 Liodessus saratogae K.B.Miller, 1998
 Liodessus strobeli (Steinheil, 1869)
 Liodessus uruguensis (Sharp, 1882)

References

Dytiscidae genera